Giacomo Giuseppe Beltritti (December 23, 1910—November 1, 1992) was an Italian prelate of the Roman Catholic Church. He served as Patriarch of Jerusalem from 1970 to 1987, the last non-Arab to hold this position until 2020.

Beltritti was born in Peveragno and came to the Holy Land in 1926, when he began studying for the priesthood at a seminary in Beit Jala in the West Bank. He was later ordained a priest on April 15, 1933. After the founding of Israel in 1948 and Israel's occupation of the West Bank in 1967, he helped Palestinians who became refugees.

On September 21, 1965, Beltritti was appointed Coadjutor Patriarch of Jerusalem and Titular Bishop of Cana by Pope Paul VI. He received his episcopal consecration on the following October 10 from Patriarch Alberto Gori, O.F.M., with Archbishop Mikhayl Assaf and Bishop Hanna Kaldany serving as co-consecrators.

He later succeeded Gori as Patriarch of Jerusalem on November 25, 1970. He served as head of the Catholic Church in Israel, the occupied West Bank and Gaza Strip, Jordan, and Cyprus for 17 years and, during that time, became known for his work in drawing young Palestinians into the priesthood and enlarging the Catholic school system.

Beltritti retired as Patriarch on December 11, 1987, and then taught catechism at the parochial school in Deir Rafat, where he resided at the local monastery. He later died in his sleep during a visit to Jerusalem, at age 81.

References

1910 births
1992 deaths
Latin Patriarchs of Jerusalem
20th-century Roman Catholic archbishops in Israel
Italian emigrants to Mandatory Palestine